Campylopus bicolor is a species of moss found in Australia and New Zealand.

References

Dicranales
Plants described in 1854
Flora of Australia
Flora of New Zealand